Ronald Stewart Burke (13 August 1921 – December 2003) was a footballer who played for Manchester United, Huddersfield Town, Rotherham United & Exeter City.

Career
Rotherham United made several attempts to sign Ronnie Burke  during the World War II years, but Manchester United got his signature. He made his debut for United against Sunderland on the 26 October 1946. Despite a great goals per game ratio (34 appearances and 22 goals) he was called upon infrequently due to the consistently good form of Morris, Rowley and Pearson. Frustrated by lack of first team opportunities and following a number of transfer requests he was allowed to leave. He then moved to Huddersfield Town, but suffered a serious knee injury, and lost his place in the Terriers team.

Rotherham
He made his debut for Rotherham in Division 2 (now Championship), scoring  two goals in a 4–3 defeat at Nottingham Forest on Good Friday  1953, and was unlucky not to get a hat-trick in his first Millers appearance.

In the next season he scored a hat-trick in the Millers 5–2 victory over Derby County on 5 December 1953, and repeated his achievement in a 7-0 thrashing of Oldham Athletic in March 1954. He finished the 1953/54 season with 33 goals, and was second highest goalscorer in Division 2.

In the 1954/55 season he scored all four Millers goals in a 4–2 victory against Bury in September 1954, but his knee injury problems flared up again and he was made available for transfer in summer 1955.

Later clubs
He then moved to Exeter City. His career at Millmoor was very successful, but was cut short by injury. After this, he moved to non-League football, first in 1957 with Tunbridge Wells United then on to Biggleswade Town.

References
 Millmoor personalities 1946-1986,  David Watson, Rotherham Metropolitan Borough Council (1986)

1921 births
2003 deaths
People from Redcar
English footballers
Association football forwards
Manchester United F.C. players
Huddersfield Town A.F.C. players
Rotherham United F.C. players
Exeter City F.C. players
Biggleswade Town F.C. players
Tunbridge Wells F.C. players
English Football League players
Sportspeople from Yorkshire